Michelle Jane Beckley (born November 28, 1969) is a former Democratic member of the Texas House of Representatives from District 65. She was first elected in November 2018, defeating incumbent Republican Ron Simmons. Texas' 65th district represents parts of southern Denton County. She did not run for reelection in 2022. She instead ran for Lieutenant Governor of Texas in 2022. She was defeated by Mike Collier in the Democratic primary.

Beckley briefly ran for the Democratic nomination for the representative of Texas's 24th congressional district.

Personal life

Education and career
Beckley attended public school in the Carrollton-Farmers Branch Independent School District. After graduating from Newman Smith High School, she attended Texas A&M University, receiving a degree in biomedical sciences in 1992.

Beckley worked in sales immediately following college, but returned to Carrollton to manage the family business, Kookaburra Bird Shop. In 2003, she purchased the shop and continues to manage it.

On July 21, 2021, Beckley announced her candidacy for Texas's 24th congressional district, a seat held by Beth Van Duyne. She dropped out of the race one month later, as a result of the newly drawn district boundaries which placed her outside of district 65.

Family
Beckley lives in Carrollton with her husband, Martin Mikes.

Texas Legislature

Beckley decided to run for office after attending the Dallas 2017 Women's March.

Beckley defeated Ron Simmons, the author of HB 2899, the so-called "Bathroom Bill," a bill that some business leaders in Texas said was unnecessary and divisive. Beckley won 51.1% to 48.9%, despite being outspent nearly six to one. Beckley was endorsed by the AFL-CIO, the Sierra Club, and Planned Parenthood.

Beckley defeated Kronda Thimesch in the 2020 general election. Beckley won 51.5% to 48.5%.

Beckley authored and co-authored numerous bills in the 86th legislative session involving LGBTQ equality, public health, and women's reproductive health.

"House Bill 978 sought to amend the Texas Family Code to use gender-neutral language when discussing marriage — changing references to “man and woman” or “husband and wife” to “two individuals” or “spouses.” The bill would also amend the Health and Safety Code to remove provisions regarding the criminality or unacceptability of “homosexual conduct.” Beckley’s bill died in the House Committee on Judiciary and Civil Jurisprudence. Its companion, Senate Bill 153 by José Rodríguez, D-El Paso, did not receive a committee hearing. Both bills received heavy pushback from religious advocacy groups who say the legislation amounts to an attack on religious freedom.

A vaccine-related amendment, introduced by Beckley, was approved in March as part of the state budget. It requires state health officials to assess the immunization rates at child care centers, which it has not done for several years."

Beckley was outspoken about HB 16, the so-called Born Alive bill. "I refuse to make a mockery out of women's health and so I joined 50 of my colleagues to register as 'Present Not Voting.' Today's vote was about Republican scorecards, not good Texas policy," she said.

General election history
2020

2018

References

External links
 
 Biography at Ballotpedia
Legislative page

1969 births
21st-century American politicians
21st-century American women politicians
Living people
Democratic Party members of the Texas House of Representatives
People from Denton County, Texas
Texas A&M University alumni
Women state legislators in Texas